The 87th Precinct is a series of police procedural novels and stories by American author Ed McBain (a writing pseudonym of Evan Hunter).  McBain's 87th Precinct works have been adapted, sometimes loosely, into movies and television on several occasions.

Setting
The series is based on the work of the police detective squad of the 87th Precinct in the central district of Isola, a large fictional city obviously based on New York City.  Isola is the name of the central district of the city (it fulfills the role of the borough of Manhattan within New York City).  Other districts in McBain's fictionalized version of New York broadly correspond to NYC's other four boroughs, Calm's Point standing in for Brooklyn, Majesta representing Queens, Riverhead substituting for the Bronx, and Bethtown for Staten Island.

The books feature a large ensemble cast, often but not always centered on about half a dozen police detectives and other supporting characters. Detective Steve Carella was a major character in the series, alongside officers Bert Kling, the ambitious youngster, the hot-tempered Roger Havilland and comic relief from the unfortunately named Meyer Meyer. A mysterious antagonist known as The Deaf Man appeared in several of the books over the years.

The 87th Precinct Mysteries

Cop Hater (1956)
The Mugger (1956)
The Pusher (1956)
The Con Man (1957)
Killer's Choice (1957)
Killer's Payoff (1958)
Lady Killer (1958)
Killer's Wedge (1959)
'til Death (1959)
King's Ransom (1959)
Give the Boys a Great Big Hand (1960)
The Heckler (1960)
See Them Die (1960)
Lady, Lady I Did It (1961)
The Empty Hours (1962) - collection of three short novellas
Like Love (1962)
Ten Plus One (1963)
Ax (1964)
He Who Hesitates (1964)
Doll (1965)
80 Million Eyes (1966)
Fuzz (1968)
Shotgun (1969)
Jigsaw (1970)
Hail, Hail the Gang's All Here (1971)
Sadie When She Died (1972)
Let's Hear It for the Deaf Man (1973)
Hail to the Chief (1973)
Bread (1974)
Blood Relatives (1975)
So Long as You Both Shall Live (1976)
Long Time No See (1977)
Calypso (1979)
Ghosts (1980)
Heat (1981)
Ice (1983)
Lightning (1984)
Eight Black Horses (1985)
Poison (1987)
Tricks (1987)
Lullaby (1989)
Vespers (1990)
Widows (1991)
Kiss (1992)
Mischief (1993)
And All Through the House (Novella - 1994)
Romance (1995)
Nocturne (1997)
The Big Bad City (1999)
The Last Dance (2000)
Money, Money, Money (2001)
Fat Ollie's Book (2002)
The Frumious Bandersnatch (2003)
Hark! (2004)
Fiddlers (2005)

Short stories and novellas
And All Through the House (1984), later published as a 40-page novella in 1994
Reruns (1987)
Merely Hate (2005) a novella in the anthology titled Transgressions, edited by Ed McBain

The following books excerpted chapters from 87th Precinct novels:
McBain's Ladies (Short Stories) (1988)
McBain's Ladies, Too (Short Stories) (1992)

Novelette
The Jesus Case (1974) - this is actually an excerpt from "Let's Hear It For The Deaf Man"

Other media

Theatrical films
Cop Hater (1958) starring Robert Loggia and Gerald O'Loughlin
The Mugger (1958) starring Kent Smith, Nan Martin and James Franciscus
The Pusher (1960) starring Robert Lansing
Tengoku to Jigoku (High and Low) (1963) Japanese film directed by Akira Kurosawa starring Toshiro Mifune, Tatsuya Nakadai and Kyōko Kagawa
Sans Mobile Apparent (Without Apparent Motive) (1971) French/Italian film starring Jean-Louis Trintignant, Carla Gravina, Jean-Pierre Marielle and Dominique Sanda
Fuzz (1972) starring Burt Reynolds, Raquel Welch, Yul Brynner, Tom Skerritt and Jack Weston
Les Liens du Sang (Blood Relatives) (1978) French/Canadian film starring Donald Sutherland, Donald Pleasence and David Hemmings
 "Способ убийства" ("Killer's Wedge") (1993) Ukraine/Russia movie

TV series and TV films
87th Precinct (1961-62 NBC) television series co-starring Robert Lansing, Gena Rowlands, Ron Harper, Gregory Walcott, and Norman Fell
Columbo: No Time to Die (based on So Long as You Both Shall Live) (1992) (TV film)
Columbo: Undercover (based on Jigsaw) (1994) (TV film)
Ed McBain's 87th Precinct: Lightning (1995) (TV film) Aired on NBC starring Randy Quaid and Ving Rhames
Ed McBain's 87th Precinct: Ice (1996) (TV film) Aired on NBC starring Dale Midkiff and Joe Pantoliano
Ed McBain's 87th Precinct: Heatwave (1997) (TV film) Aired on NBC starring Dale Midkiff and Erika Eleniak

Literature
87th Precinct (1962) (Comic Book series)
Polishataren (Cop Hater) (1990), a Swedish graphic novel written by Claes Reimerthi and drawn by Martin Sauri
The Stand: the Complete & Uncut Edition (1990) by Stephen King has a minor character, "Edward M. Norris, lieutenant of police, detective squad, in the Big Apple's 87th Precinct" (pg 71). Steve Carella is briefly mentioned.
The Last Best Hope (1998), a novel in McBain's Matthew Hope series, features Steve Carella as a supporting character.
Stephen King novella, "The Mist", one of the major characters is named Ollie Weeks, a detective from the neighboring 88th Precinct.

Podcasts 
Hark! The 87th Precinct Podcast(2016 - ongoing) [Audio Podcast] A podcast dedicated to a book-by-book exploration of the 87th Precinct series, its adaptations and spin-offs. The podcast also explores some other works by Evan Hunter and has featured interviews with Otto Penzler (writer and proprietor of The Mysterious Bookshop in New York) and James Naughtie (British radio presenter and writer). 
Paperback Warrior (2019) [Audio Podcast] features a segment on Ed McBain's 87th Precinct. The episode delves into the author's bibliography and explores his police procedural series as well as the debut novel Cop Hater. Co-Hosts Tom Simon and Eric Compton both suggest that the 87th Precinct was influenced by the television show Dragnet.

References

Prial, Frank J., "Why readers keep returning to the 87th Precinct", The New York Times, July 9, 2005. Retrieved April 12, 2011.
87th Precinct
Tipping My Fedora / 87th Precinct, reviews of all 55 volumes in the series. Retrieved 8 December 2017
Ed McBain sings Hill Street Blues, Associated Press story, in TV Week, printed in Ocala Star-Banner, April 30, 1983. Retrieved April 12, 2011

Crime novel series
Police procedurals
E. P. Dutton books
Book series introduced in 1956